Antonio de Aguiar Patriota (born April 27, 1954) is the current Ambassador of Brazil to Egypt and former Minister of Foreign Affairs. Patriota took office as foreign minister on January 1, 2011, and remained in office until August 26, 2013.

A graduate in philosophy from the University of Geneva and later international relations by the Rio Branco Institute, Patriota has taken prominent positions within the foreign service such as Brazil's ambassador to the United States between 2007 and 2009, Deputy Secretary General for Political Affairs of the Ministry of External Relations, Cabinet Chief of Foreign Minister Chancellor Celso Amorim and Secretary General of the Ministry of External Relations. He was replaced as Minister of External Relations by Luiz Figueiredo. This replacement was caused by Patriota's deemed responsibility in the operation that transported Bolivian Senator Roger Pinto Molina from the Brazilian Embassy in La Paz to the Brazilian border. Senator Molina had sought refuge in the Brazilian Embassy for 15 months.

History

Positions held within the foreign service
 1979-1982 Diplomat at the United Nations office in Brasília
 1990-1992 Diplomat at the Foreign Policy Secretariat of the Ministry of External Relations
 1992-1994 Diplomatic Adviser to the Presidency
 1994-1999 Diplomatic Adviser to the Permanent Mission of Brazil to the United Nations in New York, USA
 1999-2003 Minister at the Permanent Mission of Brazil to the United Nations in Geneva, Switzerland
 2003-2004 Secretary of Diplomatic Planning of the Ministry of External Relations
 2004-2005 Cabinet Chief of the Minister of External Relations
 2005-2007 Under Secretary-General for Political Affairs of the Ministry of External Relations
 2007-2009 Ambassador of Brazil to the United States in Washington, D.C.
 2009-2010 Secretary General of Foreign Affairs of Brazil
 2011-2013 Minister of Foreign Relations of Brazil
 2013-2016 Ambassador of Brazil to the Permanent Mission of Brazil to the United Nations in New York, USA
 2016-2019 Ambassador of Brazil to Italy in Rome
 2019- Ambassador of Brazil to Egypt in Cairo

Biography

Antonio de Aguiar Patriota was born in Rio de Janeiro on April 27, 1954. He was Deputy Foreign Minister from October 2009 to December 2010; Ambassador of Brazil to the United States from 2007 to 2009; Under Secretary General for Political Affairs at the Foreign Ministry from 2005 to 2007; Chief of Staff to the Foreign Minister, in 2004; and Secretary for Diplomatic Planning at the Foreign Ministry, in 2003.

Overseas, he also served at Brazil's Permanent Mission to the International Organizations in Geneva (1999-2003), having acted for two years as Deputy Permanent Representative to the World Trade Organization; at Brazil's Permanent Mission to the United Nations in New York (1994-1999), where he was a member of the Brazilian Delegation to the U.N. Security Council; at the Embassies of Brazil in Caracas (1988-1990) and Beijing (1987-1988); and at Brazil's Permanent Mission in Geneva (1983-1987).

From 1992 to 1994, he was Deputy Diplomatic Advisor to then President Itamar Franco.

He graduated from Brazil's Diplomatic Academy, the Rio Branco Institute, in 1979. His thesis for the Advanced Studies Course at the Rio Branco Institute, titled “The Security Council After the Gulf War: articulating a new paradigm for collective security”, was published in 1988.

Minister Antonio Patriota is married to Tania Cooper Patriota, who is currently the Representative of the United Nations Population Fund (UNFPA) in Bogotá and Caracas, and they have two sons, Miguel and Thomas.

References

https://web.archive.org/web/20120116041132/http://www.itamaraty.gov.br/o-ministerio/curriculos/ministro-das-relacoes-exteriores/view

External links

|-

1954 births
Living people
Brazilian diplomats
Ambassadors of Brazil to the United States
Foreign ministers of Brazil
Permanent Representatives of Brazil to the United Nations
Recipients of the Order of the Liberator General San Martin
Ambassadors of Brazil to Egypt